Pseudoschinia is a genus of moths of the family Crambidae. It contains only one species, Pseudoschinia elautalis, which is found in North America, where it has been recorded from Arizona, California, Nevada, New Mexico and Texas.

The length of the forewings is 10–13 mm. The forewings are pale ochreous yellow. The hindwings are white. Adults have been recorded on wing from March to August.

The larvae feed on Ferocactus cylindraceus, Ferocactus wislizeni, Opuntia and Cylindropuntia species. They primarily feed on the flowers and fruits of prickly pears. When feeding on barrel cactus, they consume flesh growth.
The larvae are white with several narrow crimson transverse bands. Pupation takes place on the ground in a cocoon covered with earth.

References

External links 
Natural History Museum Lepidoptera genus database

Eurrhypini
Crambidae genera
Taxa named by Eugene G. Munroe